The King and Other Stories is a collection of short stories by American author Joe R. Lansdale. This book was published as a limited edition by Subterranean Press. It is long out of print.

Table of contents
 Introduction
 Regular Sex and Admiration
 An Arrow in the Air
 Boots
 Levitation
 Beatcha
 Haunted House
 Ducks
 Willard and the Painting
 Coronation
 The Closet
 Private Eye
 Snake
 Terry and the Hat
 The Munchies
 After the War
 Little Blue Bottle
 Goodies
 The King

References

External links

Author's Official Website
Publisher's Website

Short story collections by Joe R. Lansdale
2005 short story collections
American short story collections
Horror short story collections
Works by Joe R. Lansdale
Subterranean Press books